Haploposthia is a genus of worms belonging to the family Proporidae.

The species of this genus are found in Europe and America.

Species

Species:

Haploposthia brunea 
Haploposthia erythrocephala 
Haploposthia lactomaculata

References

Acoelomorphs